The 2011 GoDaddy.com Bowl, the twelfth edition of the college football bowl game, was played at Ladd–Peebles Stadium in Mobile, Alabama on January 6, 2011. The game was telecast on ESPN and matched Miami from the MAC versus Middle Tennessee from the Sun Belt. Previously, the bowl game was known as the GMAC Bowl.

Teams

Middle Tennessee

This was Middle Tennessee's first bowl appearance in the GoDaddy.com Bowl. Entering the game, offense leaders for the Blue Raiders were RB Phillip Tanner (149 att., 841 yds. rushing, 11 TDs), QB Dwight Dasher (127 of 222 passes, 1,388 yards, 6 TDs) and WR Malcolm Beyah (27 rec., 364 yds., 2 TDs). Defensively, the team was led by DB Jeremy Kellem (101 tackles, 1.5 tfl, 2 INT), DE Jamari Lattimore (64 tackles, 14.5 tfl, 11.0 sacks) and LB Darin Davis (73 tackles, 8.0 tfl, 3.5 sacks, 3 interceptions).

Miami

This was Miami's second appearance in this bowl game; they played in the 2003 edition when it was under the name GMAC Bowl. Miami was one of the most improved program in the country, capped a dramatic turnaround season by winning the 2010 marathon MAC Football Championship. The RedHawks defeated Northern Illinois, 26–21, with a touchdown
with 33 seconds left in regulation. Miami clinched the East Division with a 23–3 win over Temple on November 23.

Game summary

Scoring summary

Statistics

Notes
 This was the first meeting between these two teams.
 Miami became the first FBS team ever to follow a 10-loss season with a 10-win season; the RedHawks went 1–11 the previous season. However, this was not the biggest turnaround in FBS history as measured by games. The FBS record turnaround by that measure remains the -game turnaround by Hawaii from 0–12 in 1999 to 9–4 in 2000. Miami's turnaround from 1–11 to 10–4 amounted to an 8-game turnaround.

References

External links
 ESPN summary

GMAC Bowl
LendingTree Bowl
Miami RedHawks football bowl games
Middle Tennessee Blue Raiders football bowl games
GoDaddy.com Bowl